Emma Rayne Lyle (born August 26, 2003) is an American actress best known for her role as Emily Reddy in the feature film I Don't Know How She Does It (2011), which earned her the Young Artist Award as Best Young Actress Age Ten and Under.

Career
Lyle portrayed Nicole Bloom  in the feature film Why Stop Now (2012), which earned her a Young Artist Award nomination as Best Supporting Young Actress Age Ten and Under. She is also known for her role as Jackie in Return (2011), where she plays Linda Cardellini and Michael Shannon's daughter. She plays the role of 'Bridgette' in her latest film Jessica Darling's It List (2016), based on the book series by Megan McCafferty

Filmography

Film

Television

Theatre

Awards and nominations

References

External links
 

2003 births
Actresses from Tampa, Florida
American child actresses
American film actresses
American television actresses
Living people
21st-century American women